Eric James Mandanas Camson (born June 12, 1990) is a Filipino professional basketball player for the Terrafirma Dyip of the Philippine Basketball Association (PBA). He was drafted 16th overall in the 2013 PBA draft by the Air21 Express.

College career 
Camson played for the Adamson Soaring Falcons while he was in college. He significantly improved in his final two years of college, averaging 40% shooting from three and was among the top five rebounders in the UAAP. In his senior year, he led the Falcons in scoring and rebounding with averages of 14.5 points and 9.1 rebounds a game.

Professional career

Air 21 Express/NLEX Road Warriors 
Camson was drafted 16th overall in the 2013 PBA draft by the Air21 Express. In his rookie year, he had eight points and ten rebounds in a loss to Barangay Ginebra San Miguel. He then made the lineup for the Rookie vs Sophomores game in his sophomore year. He didn't get much playing time in his first three years in the league but that changed with the arrival of coach Yeng Guiao and a MCL injury to big man Enrico Villanueva. He scored 14 points in a loss to the Rain or Shine Elasto Painters.

Mahindra Floodbuster/Terrafirma franchise 
During the 2017 Commissioner's Cup, Camson was traded to the Mahindra Floodbuster along with Glenn Khobuntin and a 2020 second-round pick in exchange for Alex Mallari and Kenneth Ighalo. In his first game for Mahindra, he had nine points, three rebounds, and two assists in 18 minutes in a win over the Blackwater Elite. During the 2017 Governors' Cup, he was fined P5,000 for committing a flagrant foul in their games versus the TNT Katropa. 

In the 2017–18 Philippine Cup, Camson had a career-high 24 points in a loss to his former team. He got into an elbow match against Raymond Almazan of Rain or Shine, and was ejected from the game. He was then fined P30K and suspended for one game. 

The Dyip fell short of making the playoffs thrice the following season. Camson was re-signed at the end of their season.

In the 2021 Philippine Cup, Camson had 15 points (including the game-sealing score) and 13 rebounds to help Terrafirma score an upset win over Ginebra.

PBA career statistics

As of the end of 2021 season

Season-by-season averages
 
|-
| align=left | 
| align=left | Air21
| 35 || 10.9 || .434 || .000 || .545 || 3.5 || .2 || .3 || .1 || 3.5
|-
| align=left | 
| align=left | NLEX
| 19 ||	5.9 || .303 || .000 || .571 || 1.7 || .3 || .4 || .1 || 1.3
|-
| align=left | 
| align=left | NLEX
| 9 || 6.9 || .571 || .000 || .667 || 1.6 || .3 || .2 || .2 || 3.1
|-
| align=left rowspan=2| 
| align=left | NLEX
| rowspan=2|31 || rowspan=2|12.8 || rowspan=2|.365 || rowspan=2|.299 || rowspan=2|.714 || rowspan=2|3.1 || rowspan=2|.5 || rowspan=2|.4 || rowspan=2|.2 || rowspan=2|6.0
|-
| align=left | Mahindra / Kia
|-
| align=left | 
| align=left | Kia / Columbian
| 25 ||	18.4 || .397 || .262 || .667 || 4.8 || 1.0 || .8 || .1 || 9.9
|-
| align=left | 
| align=left | Columbian
| 29 ||	12.6 || .347 || .250 || .808 || 3.0 || .6 || .4 || .2 || 6.0
|-
| align=left | 
| align=left | Terrafirma
| 10 ||	18.6 || .457 || .313 || .769 || 3.2 || 1.3 || .5 || .0 || 8.4
|-
| align=left | 
| align=left | Terrafirma
| 20 ||	14.7 || .385 || .150 || .727 || 3.8 || .8 || .3 || .3 || 5.1
|-
| align=left | 
| align=left | Terrafirma
| 33 ||	20.3 || .444 || .333 || .701 || 5.3 || .9 || .5 || .1 || 10.0
|-class=sortbottom
| align=center colspan=2 | Career
| 211 || 13.9 || .402 || .266 || .703 || 3.6 || .6 || .4 || .1 || 6.2

References

1990 births
Living people
Adamson Soaring Falcons basketball players
Air21 Express draft picks
Air21 Express players
Basketball players from Batangas
Filipino men's basketball players
NLEX Road Warriors players
Power forwards (basketball)
Terrafirma Dyip players